Commodore Perry in the Land of the Shogun is a 1985 children's book by Rhoda Blumberg. This large-format book tells the story of Commodore Perry and the Black Ships that coerced Japan into ending its policy of isolation by establishing commercial and diplomatic relationships with other nations in 1854. The book is illustrated with period prints. Two-thirds of the illustrations are by Japanese artists, the remainder by artists with the American fleet.

Reception
Told from the perspective of the Americans involved, and some reviewers criticized it for underplaying the military threat to Japan implicit in Perry's expedition, and ignoring the broader context of American expansionism. Others praised it for its evenhanded treatment of cultural misunderstanding; a Japanese guest on board one of the Black Shops drinks a glass of olive oil, but an American sailor ashore tastes and buys a bottle of Japanese hair oil thinking it is liquor. Noel Perrin praised the book for telling both sides, "how the Japanese looked to the Americans, but also how the Americans looked to the Japanese;" he called Blumberg's book, "irresistible."

Awards
The book won the 1986 Golden Kite Award, the 1985 Boston Globe–Horn Book Award, and was named a 1986 Newbery Medal honor book.

Details
Commodore Perry in the Land of the Shogun. New York : Lothrop, Lee & Shepard Books, 1985. 144 pages.

References

American children's books
1985 children's books
Newbery Honor-winning works
Children's history books
History books about Japan